Goizueta may refer to:

 Goizueta, Navarre, Spanish municipality 
 Goizueta Business School,  Atlanta, Georgia 
 People:
 Roberto Goizueta (1931–1997), Cuban-American engineer, manager, and philanthropist
  Roberto S. Goizueta (b. 1954), American theologian